The Lake Worth Playhouse, located at 713 Lake Avenue in Lake Worth Beach, Florida, is a venue offering a variety of mainstream and alternative programming, both live and, in its Stonzek Theatre, on film. Built by the brothers Clarence and Lucien Oakley, it opened its doors as the Oakley Theatre in 1924, showing silent movies. It had a Wurlitzer pipe organ, lost in the hurricane of 1928, which virtually demolished the theatre, including its Moorish Deco front. It was rebuilt in a Streamline Moderne style, one of the oldest surviving examples of this architectural style, and reopened in 1929, adding its neon sign, which may be the oldest still in use in the United States in its original location. The theatre changed hands and names several times, and became deteriorated; as the Playtoy, in 1969, it presented the Palm Beach County premiere of Deep Throat. In 1975 the Lake Worth Playhouse (incorporated 1953) purchased the theatre and carried out extensive renovations. It is the oldest surviving Art Deco building in Palm Beach County. It is the host of the annual L-DUB Film Festival.

References

External links 
 Official Web site

Lake Worth Beach, Florida
Theatres in Florida
Art Deco architecture in Florida
Film festivals in Florida
Buildings and structures in Lake Worth Beach, Florida